Henry Bellingham, Baron Bellingham (born 1955) is a British politician who sits in the House of Lords and was formally MP for North West Norfolk.

Henry Bellingham may also refer to:

 Henry Bellingham (c. 1564–1637), English MP for Chichester
 Sir Henry Bellingham, 1st Baronet (died 1650), English MP for Westmorland
 Henry Bellingham (Irish politician) (died 1676), Anglo-Irish soldier and politician
 Henry Bellingham (died 1755), Anglo-Irish politician
 Sir Henry Bellingham, 4th Baronet (1846–1921), British MP for County Louth, Lord Lieutenant of Louth